Desmetramadol, also known as O-desmethyltramadol (O-DSMT), is an opioid analgesic and the main active metabolite of tramadol. Tramadol is demethylated by the liver enzyme CYP2D6 in the same way as codeine, and so similarly to the variation in effects seen with codeine, individuals who have a less active form of CYP2D6 ("poor metabolizers") will tend to get reduced analgesic effects from tramadol. This also results in a ceiling effect (dependent on CYP2D6 availability) which limits tramadol's range of therapeutic benefits to the treatment of moderate pain.

Pharmacology

Pharmacodynamics
(+)-Desmetramadol is a G-protein biased μ-opioid receptor full agonist. It shows comparatively far lower affinity for the δ- and κ-opioid receptors.

The two enantiomers of desmetramadol show quite distinct pharmacological profiles; both (+) and (−)-desmetramadol are inactive as serotonin reuptake inhibitors, but (−)-desmetramadol retains activity as a norepinephrine reuptake inhibitor, and so the mix of both the parent compound and metabolites contributes significantly to the complex pharmacological profile of tramadol. While the multiple receptor targets can be beneficial in the treatment of pain (especially complex pain syndromes such as neuropathic pain), it increases the potential for drug interactions compared to other opioids, and may also contribute to side effects.

Desmetramadol is also an antagonist of the serotonin 5-HT2C receptor, at pharmacologically relevant concentrations, via competitive inhibition. This suggests that the apparent anti-depressant properties of tramadol may be at least partially mediated by desmetramadol, thus prolonging the duration of therapeutic benefit.

Inhibition of the 5-HT2C receptor is a suggested factor in the mechanism of anti-depressant effects of agomelatine and maprotiline. The potential selectivity and favorable side effect profile of desmetramadol compared to its prodrug, tramadol, makes it more suitable for clinical use, although no such large scale controlled trials have been conducted with patients.

Upon inhibition of the receptor, downstream signaling causes dopamine and norepinephrine release, and the receptor is thought to significantly regulate mood, anxiety, feeding, and reproductive behavior. 5-HT2C receptors regulate dopamine release in the striatum, prefrontal cortex, nucleus accumbens, hippocampus, hypothalamus, and amygdala, among others.

Research indicates that some suicide victims have an abnormally high number of 5-HT2C receptors in the prefrontal cortex. There is some mixed evidence that agomelatine, a 5-HT2C antagonist, is an effective antidepressant. Antagonism of 5-HT2C receptors by agomelatine results in an increase of dopamine and norepinephrine activity in the frontal cortex.

Pharmacokinetics

Metabolites
Desmetramadol is metabolized in the liver into the active metabolite N,O-didesmethyltramadol via CYP3A4 and CYP2B6. The inactive tramadol metabolite N-desmethyltramadol is metabolized into the active metabolite N,O-didesmethyltramadol by CYP2D6.

History

Society and culture

Recreational use
Desmetramadol has been sold in a blend called Krypton and marketed as powdered kratom leaf (Mitragyna speciosa). Krypton was reportedly linked to at least 9 accidental deaths from overdose in Sweden during 2010–2011.

Medicinal use
Unusually for a compound that first came to prominence as a recreational designer drug, desmetramadol has recently been reevaluated as a potential novel analgesic drug for use in medicine, with its well studied pharmacology and toxicology as an active metabolite of the widely used analgesic drug tramadol offering advantages over more structurally novel alternatives. Human clinical trials have shown it to offer similar analgesic benefits to drugs such as oxycodone and fentanyl but with reduced respiratory depression and a comparatively favorable safety profile.

Legality

United Kingdom
Desmetramadol was made a Class A drug in the United Kingdom on 26 Feb 2013.

Controlled substance in NY.

See also 
 Kratom
 List of investigational analgesics
 Tapentadol
 Nortilidine
 O-AMKD
 TLR4

References 

5-HT2C antagonists
Dimethylamino compounds
Analgesics
Cyclohexanols
Designer drugs
Mu-opioid receptor agonists
Norepinephrine reuptake inhibitors
Opioid metabolites
Phenols
Synthetic opioids
Human drug metabolites